The United States Army Space and Missile Defense Command (USASMDC) is an Army Service Component Command (ASCC) of the United States Army. The command was established in 1997.
The current USASMDC commander is Lieutenant General Daniel L. Karbler with Senior Enlisted Advisor Command Sergeant Major John W. Foley.

The Army Space Command (ARSPACE) stood up in April 1988 as a field operating agency of the Deputy Chief of Staff (of the Army) for Operations and Plans. As the Army component of U.S. Space Command, ARSPACE was to provide the Army perspective in planning for Department of Defense space support and ensure the integration of Army requirements into joint planning for space support and "conduct planning for DoD space operations in support of Army strategic, operational and tactical missions."

A relatively small organization, it was soon put to the test. The new command was instrumental in bringing space assets to U.S. Army forces during Operation Desert Storm. Following the war, new operational missions, such as the Army Space Support Teams and the Joint Tactical Ground Stations, became key elements of the Army space program.

Organizationally however, ARSPACE remained a command, a Tables of Distribution and Allowances, or TDA, organization with offices and directorates according to mission, rather than an Army operational Table of Organization and Equipment unit. This changed on 1 May 1995. On that date, ARSPACE's Military Satellite Communications Directorate or MILSATCOM Directorate became the 1st Satellite Control, or SATCON, Battalion—the first Army battalion with an operational mission tied to space systems and capabilities.

Structure
The SMDC is made up of several components, Active Army and full-time Army National Guard, due to the 24-hour a day, 7-day a week, 365-day a year nature of SMDC's mission:

U.S. Army Space and Missile Defense Command (SMDC) Headquarters and the Force Development Integration Center co-located with the Missile Defense Agency on Redstone Arsenal, Alabama
U.S. Army SMDC/ARSTRAT  satellite site located on Peterson AFB, Colorado Springs, Colorado
1st Space Brigade, Peterson Space Force Base, Colorado 
1st Space Battalion
2nd Space Battalion
100th Missile Defense Brigade (GMD), Schriever Space Force Base, Colorado
49th Missile Defense Battalion, Alaska Army National Guard, Fort Greely, Alaska
Satellite Operations Brigade is transferring to the Space Force
53rd Signal Battalion (SATCON) becoming 53rd Space Operations Squadron, USSF; mission transfer under way August 15, 2022
Satellite Communications Directorate
Space and Missile Defense Technical Center (SMDTC)
Space and Missile Defense Battle Lab (SMDBL)

The 117th Space Battalion has a training, readiness, and oversight (TRO) relationship with the 1st Space Brigade but is not actually part of it, as of 2018–19.

Technical Center, based in Huntsville, Alabama;
U.S. Army Kwajalein Atoll/Reagan Test Site (USAKA/RTS), in the Republic of the Marshall Islands and at Wake Island
High Energy Laser Systems Test Facility (HELSTF), at White Sands Missile Range, New Mexico.
Space and Missile Defense Acquisition Center (SMDAC) 
other directorates

History
Design work for the Safeguard System anti-ballistic missile complex began in 1968. The initial ground breaking occurred in 1970. The test period began in September 1973 and concluded with the equipment readiness date. Four and half years after the initial contracts were signed, the completed facility was turned over to the government. On 27 September 1974, at the Missile Site Radar Complex near Nekoma, North Dakota, and at the Ballistic Missile Defense Center at NORAD, Cheyenne Mountain, the Safeguard facilities were officially transferred to the U.S. Army Ballistic Missile Defense Systems Command after a four and a half year construction project by ten companies.

Previously the Joint Land Attack Cruise Missile Defense Elevated Netted Sensors Project Office (JLENS) based in Huntsville, Alabama was part of SMDC's Space and Missile Defence Acquisition Center. However, after continuing problems with the programme, the fiscal 2017 budget for the JLENS program was cut from the requested $45 million to $2.5 million. According to Defense News, the "nearly unanimous lack of funding for the program spells death for JLENS". The blimps are being kept in storage and the small budget being used to close out the program, according to Defense News.

Other parts of the previous Space and Missile Defense Acquisition Center included:
High Energy Laser Systems Test Facility (HELSTF), at White Sands Missile Range, New Mexico.
Army Space Program Office (ASPO) in Alexandria, Virginia
Ballistic Missile Targets Joint Project Office (BMTJPO) based in Huntsville, Alabama

The United States Army Futures Command, formed 24 August 2018, gives priority to modernization of air and missile defense.   Cross-functional teams were instituted to oversee the  modernization effort in the areas of hypersonic systems, maneuver SHORAD (M-SHORAD) and Integrated Air and Missile Defense Battle Command System (IBCS).

List of commanding generals

Notes

See also
Joint Functional Component Command for Integrated Missile Defense

Comparable organizations
Naval Network Warfare Command (U.S. Navy)
Air Force Space Command (U.S. Air Force)

References

External links
 Official website
 
 Future Warfare Preparation: US Army Space & Missile Defense Command – animated dramatization of various missile defense scenarios (YouTube video made by Delta Research Inc for SMDC)

United States Army Service Component Commands
Space units and formations of the United States Army
Organizations based in Colorado Springs, Colorado
Military units and formations established in 1997
United States Strategic Command